Zhang Jianfeng (745–800), courtesy name Benli, was a Tang Dynasty statesman and general.

He flourished under the Emperor Dezong, and distinguished himself by his skilful operations against the rebels of that period. He rose to be a Minister of State, and so completely gained the confidence of the Emperor that at his last audience the latter presented him with his own riding-whip, saying, "In your fidelity and devotion, adversity works no change." His favourite concubine 盼盼 P'an-p'an, was so overcome by the news of his death that on hearing a poem in which reference was made to his grave, she threw herself out of the window and was killed.

References

Tang dynasty jiedushi of Wuning Circuit
745 births
800 deaths
Tang dynasty politicians from Shandong
Politicians from Jining
Tang dynasty generals from Shandong